Bidarahalli is a village located in Mundargi taluk in Gadag district, Karnataka, India.

References 

Villages in Gadag district